Primate families include 11 categories of this  taxonomic rank, which include 57 genera and approximately 175 species. In  attached list, there are shown in scientific (Latin) names of families and genera, with the usual names on the English and Bosnian language.

Families, genera, and species number 
(n) = number of species in genera.

 Lorisidae: 7 genera,  10 species
 Loris (1) =  Slender loris = 
 Nycticebus  (2) = Slow loris = 
 Perodicticus (1) = Potto = 
 Arctocebus (1) =  Angwantibo = 
 Galago (2) = Bushbabies = 
 Otolemur (1) = Greater bushbabies = 
 Euoticus (2) =  Needle-nailed galagos = 
 Microcebus (3) = Mouse lemurs = 
 Cheirogaleus (2) = Dwarf lemurs = 
 Allocebus (1) = Hairy-eared dwarf lemur = 
 Phaner (1) = Fork-marked dwarf lemur = 
 Lemur (6) = Lemurs = 
 Varecia (1) = Ruffed lemur = 
 Hapalemur (2) = Gentle lemurs = 
 Lepilemur (1) =  Sportive lemur = 
 Indriidae:   3 genera  4 species
 Propithecus (2) = Sifakas = 
 Indri (1) = Indri = 
 Avahi (1) = Woolly lemur = 
 Daubentoniidae: 1 genus, 1 species
 Daubentonia (1) = Aye-aye = 
 Tarsiidae: 1 genus, 3 species
 Tarsius (3) = Tarsiers =  
 Cebidae: 11 genera,  30 species
 Cebus (4) = Capuchins = 
 Aotus (1) = Douroucouli (Night monkey) = 
 Callicebus (3) = Titis =  )
 Saimiri (2) = Skquirrel monkeys = 
 Pithecia (2)  = Sakis = 
 Cacajao (3) = Uacaris = 
 Chiropotes (2) = Bearded sakis = 
 Alouatta (6) = Howler monkeys = 
 Ateles (4) = Spider monkeys = 
 Brachyteles (1) = Woolly spider monkeys = 
 Lagothrix (2) = Woolly monkeys = 
 Callitrichidae: 5 genera, 17 species
 Callithrix (3) = Marmosets = 
 Cebuella (1) = Pygmy marmoset = 
 Saguinus (11) = Tamarins  = 
 Leontopithecus (1) = Lion-tamarin =  
 Callimico (1) = Goeldi's marmoset = 
 Cercopithecidae: 16 genera, over 80 species
 Macaca (16) = Macaques = 
 Cercocebus (4) = Mangabeys = 
 Papio (5)  = Baboons = 
 Mandrillus (2) = Mandrill and Drill = 
 Theropithecus (1) = Gelada = 
 Cercopithecus (20) = Quenons = 
 Miopithecus (2) = Talapoins  = 
 Allenopithecus (1) = Allen's swamp monkey = 
 Erythrocebus (1) = Patas monkey =  
 Colobus (6) = Colobus monkeys = 
 Procolobus (1) = Olive colobus  = 
 Presbytis (16) = Leaf monkeys, langurs = 
 Pygathrix (1) = Douc = 
 Rhinopithecus (2) = Snub-nosed monkey's = 
 Nasalis (1) = Proboscis monkey = 
 Simias (1) = Pig-tailed leaf monkey = 
 Hylobatidae:   2 genera, 6 species
 Hylobates (6) = Gibbons and Siamangs = 
 Pongidae: 3 genera  4 species
 Pongo (2) = Orangutan = 
 Pan  (2) = Chimpanzee = 
 Gorilla (2) = Gorilla = 
 Hominidae'': 1 genus, 1 species
 Homo (1) = Human  = 

Note
The numbers in brackets beside name of the genus stated number corresponding known species.

See also
 Primates

References

Primates and humans